Ophiusa microtirhaca is a moth of the family Erebidae first described by Shigero Sugi in 1990. It is found in Asia, including Japan.

References

External links

Ophiusa
Moths of Japan
Moths described in 1990